This is a summary of the year 2019 in Irish music.

Events
4 January – Former Senator James Heffernan is convicted of the assault of three gardaí after an incident at the Indiependence music festival in County Cork during August 2016.
18 January – The members of The Cranberries receive honorary doctorates from the University of Limerick.
25 January – The Ulster Orchestra announces the appointment of Daniele Rustioni as its next chief conductor, effective September 2019.
31 January – The radio station RTÉ 2fm is renamed Larry Gogan FM for a day in honour of the retirement of the presenter, who is retiring after 40 years with the station.
28 February–3 March – The New Music Dublin Festival takes place.
 7 June – In the British Queen's Birthday Honours, Feargal Sharkey is made an Officer of the Order of the British Empire.
25 June – A statue of folk musician Luke Kelly in Sheriff Street, Dublin, is vandalised with black paint. It is subsequently restored by specialists.

Classical works
Jennifer Walshe – The Site of the Investigation

Albums
Celtic Woman – The Magic of Christmas
Westlife – Spectrum
Swan Hennessy – Complete String Quartets and String Trio

Deaths
7 February – Arthur Murphy, 90, singer and radio presenter
17 March – Bernie Tormé, 66, guitarist (Gillan, Guy McCoy Tormé, Atomic Rooster, Desperado)
22 April – Heather Harper, 88, opera singer
11 July – Brendan Grace, 68, comedian and singer (lung cancer)
6 August – Danny Doyle, 79, folk singer
19 September – Sandie Jones, 68, pop singer
28 September – Dessie O'Halloran, 79, folk fiddler and singer
18 December – Arty McGlynn, 75, folk guitarist (Patrick Street)

See also 
 2019 in Ireland

References 

 
2019